Andre Dontrel Burt Jr. (born October 3, 2001), known professionally as SoFaygo (formerly stylized as $oFaygo), is an American rapper and singer. In 2020, Burt released the Angelic 7 mixtape, which included his 2019 breakthrough single "Knock Knock", which went viral on TikTok in late 2020. His debut album Pink Heartz released on November 11, 2022 through Travis Scott's Cactus Jack Records. He has also collaborated with other prestigious artists, such as Don Toliver (also from Cactus Jack), Nav (who he is set to go on tour with), and Trippie Redd, among others.

Career

2018-2019: Beginnings
Burt recorded his first song at nine years old in a friend's basement. He began to more heavily pursue music in his teenage years, while attending Etowah High School. Burt went by the stage name Trvllinese prior to releasing the EP We Are Aliens in 2018.

Burt released his debut mixtape War in 2019. Soon after, he began amassing a local fanbase. This popularity led him to be discovered by Taz Taylor, the founder of the record label Internet Money, who offered to sign him to the label. Burt later travelled to Los Angeles to consider this offer, but eventually declined. At this time, Burt had befriended rapper Lil Tecca, and the two began collaborating. This collaboration led to the release of his second mixtape, Angelic 7, which concluded with his 2019 single "Knock Knock". Following the project's release, his online fanbase grew further, and the song later became viral on the video-sharing app TikTok.

2021-present: After Me and Pink Heartz
Shortly afterward, he released his third mixtape After Me, which was preceded by the singles "Off the Map" and "Everyday". In February 2021, Burt had signed to Travis Scott's label Cactus Jack Records, which includes other popular rappers such as Sheck Wes and Don Toliver. In June 2021, Burt appeared on Genius's web series Open Mic to perform his single "Knock Knock".

On July 28, 2021, SoFaygo announced on both his Instagram and Twitter accounts that his debut album Pink Heartz was nearly completed.

On August 20, 2021, SoFaygo was featured on Trippie Redd's album, Trip at Knight, on the song "MP5". The song became his first Billboard Hot 100 entry, debuting at #86. On September 1, 2021, he released the song "Let's Lose Our Minds", being the lead single for Pink Heartz and his first release under Cactus Jack since his signing. On October 8, SoFaygo was featured on labelmate Don Toliver's album Life of a Don, on the track "Smoke".

On June 14, 2022, SoFaygo released the B4PINK EP, in anticipation of Pink Heartz. On the same day, XXL revealed that SoFaygo is a part of their "2022 Freshman Class".

Just a month later, on July 15, 2022, his reportedly leaked EP Babyjack appeared exclusively on SoundCloud, under the account 'prettyboyarchive'. On October 17, 2022, four songs from his debut album Pink Heartz were released, with a feature from Ken Carson. He announced the November 11 release date for the album on the same day.

Artistry 
SoFaygo's main influences include other rappers such as Drake, Travis Scott, Chief Keef, Lil Wayne, Chris Brown, Playboi Carti and Lil Uzi Vert.

Discography 
Studio albums
 Pink Heartz (2022)

Mixtapes
 War (2019)
 Angelic 7 (2020)
 After Me (2020)

EPs
 Goonland (2018)
 We Are Aliens (2018)
 Delineation (2019)
 Hostility (2019)
 The Reveal Vol. 1 (2020)
 4U (2020)
 Web (2020)
 B4Pink (2022)
 Babyjack (2022)
 PLUS+'' (2023)

References 

Living people
2001 births
American rappers
African-American male rappers
21st-century American rappers
21st-century American male musicians
American hip hop singers
Rappers from Georgia (U.S. state)
21st-century African-American musicians